The Sigma 24mm F1.4 DG HSM Art is an interchangeable wide angle lens for full frame cameras. It was announced by Sigma Corporation on February 10, 2015. A full two stops faster than most 24mm primes, it is designed to capture wide angle imagery with shallow depth of field, as one might with a medium or large format camera.

A review by LensTip gave the lens high praise in all aspects except coma, vignetting and autofocus speed, while Amateur Photographer highlighted its sharpness and "smooth, attractive rendition of out-of-focus regions".

References

 

024mm F1.4 DG HSM Art
Camera lenses introduced in 2015